Gougerotin is a water-soluble pyrimidine-based antibiotic which is produced by the bacteria Streptomyces graminearus and Streptomyces gougerotii. Gougerotin is named after the dermatologist Henri-Eugène Gougerot. Gougerotin has activity against Gram-positive and Gram-negative bacteria as well as against viruses.

References

Further reading 

 
 
 
 

Gougerotin